The 1999–2000 Swiss Cup is the 75th season of Switzerland's annual football cup competition. It began on 7 August 1999 with the first games of Round 1 and ended on 28 May 2000 with the Final. The winners of the competition qualified for the 2000-01 UEFA cup first round.

Participating clubs

Round 1

|colspan="3" style="background-color:#99CCCC"|7 August 1999

|-
|colspan="3" style="background-color:#99CCCC"|8 August 1999

|}

Round 2

|colspan="3" style="background-color:#99CCCC"|20 August 1999

|-
|colspan="3" style="background-color:#99CCCC"|21–22 August 1999

|}

Round 3

|colspan="3" style="background-color:#99CCCC"|4 September 1999

|-
|colspan="3" style="background-color:#99CCCC"|5 September 1999

|-
|colspan="3" style="background-color:#99CCCC"|14 September 1999

|}

Round 4

|colspan="3" style="background-color:#99CCCC"|23 September 1999

|-
|colspan="3" style="background-color:#99CCCC"|24 September 1999

|-
|colspan="3" style="background-color:#99CCCC"|25 September 1999

|-
|colspan="3" style="background-color:#99CCCC"|26 September 1999

|-
|colspan="3" style="background-color:#99CCCC"|14 November 1999

|}

Round 5

|colspan="3" style="background-color:#99CCCC"|13 November 1999

|-
|colspan="3" style="background-color:#99CCCC"|14 November 1999

|-
|colspan="3" style="background-color:#99CCCC"|5 December 1999

|}

Round 6

|colspan="3" style="background-color:#99CCCC"|4 March 2000

|-
|colspan="3" style="background-color:#99CCCC"|5 March 2000

|}

Quarterfinals

|colspan="3" style="background-color:#99CCCC"|4 March 2000

|}

Semifinals

Final

Sources and references 
 RSSSF Page

Swiss Cup seasons
Swiss Cup
Swiss Cup